Spring Love is a 2013 Taiwanese idol television drama series. The show was produced and filmed by GTV and it stars Mike He as the main male lead with DaYuan Lin from Taiwanese girl group Popu Lady as the main female lead. The show started filming on August 13, 2012 and will continue to film till February 1, 2013. The first episode was aired on January 27, 2013 on FTV.

Synopsis
After his mother's death, Long Tai (Mike He) returns to Taiwan in search for his long lost father and twin brother. When people mistake him for his brother, who has left the country, he perpetuates the mistake; the change does not go unnoticed by his brother's foe, Zhao Ren Hu (Nylon Chen), who has planned on defeating Long Tian He (Mike He). In a festival competition, Zhao tries to take over Long's hot spring, but is defeated by Long Tai: as per agreement, Zhao sends his sister (DaYuan Lin) to Long's house to work as an indenture servant for a year, but secretly orders her to spy on Long. But his sister has other things in mind.

Cast and characters

Soundtrack
Note: Some song titles are in Chinese without English titles.

Episode ratings

Broadcast
 Note: The time in the timeslot section is listed according to the Time in Taiwan.

References

External links
GTV Official site

Formosa Television original programming
2013 Taiwanese television series debuts
2013 Taiwanese television series endings
Taiwanese romance television series
Gala Television original programming
Television shows written by Wen Yu-fang